Gernot is a German masculine given name, derived from Old High German "ger" (spear) and "khnoton" (to brandish). It is rare, but still in use in German speaking countries today. 

Gundomar I, King of the Burgundians c. 407–411 is named Gernot in the Nibelungenlied.

Notable people called Gernot
Gernot von Fulda, head of Fulda monastery in 1165
Gernot Blümel (born 1981), Austrian politician
Gernot Endemann (born 1942), German actor, host of Sesamstraße 1986–99 (see German article)
Gernot Pachernigg (born 1981), Austrian singer
Gernot Reinstadler (1970–1991), Austrian ski racer
Gernot Rohr (born 1953), German football manager
Gernot Schwab (born 1979), Austrian luger
Gernot Wagner (born 1980), Austrian-American economist and author
Gernot Liebchen Principal Academic in Computing at Bournemouth University

German masculine given names